Bruce George (1942–2020) was a British Labour Party politician.

Bruce George may also refer to:

 Tony George (weightlifter) (Bruce Ronald George, 1919–2006), New Zealand weightlifter
 Bruce George (Genius Is Common), founder of the Genius Is Common movement